Skjersholmane–Utbjoa Ferry was an automobile ferry which connected the island of Stord to the mainland in Vindafjord. The route was operated by Hardanger Sunnhordlandske Dampskipsselskap and ran between Skjersholmane on Stord to Utbjoa on the mainland. The last ferry to operate the route was MF Rosendal, which had a capacity for 50 cars and 260 passengers. The route was terminated from 27 December 2000, when the Bømlafjord Tunnel, part of the Triangle Link, opened. In 2000 the ferry transported 59,974 vehicles and 133,857 passengers.

References
Bibliography
 

Notes

Car ferry lines in Vestland
Stord
Vindafjord